Colyers is an electoral ward in the London Borough of Bexley. It consists of parts of Barnehurst, Erith and Northumberland Heath. Ward Councillors are Brian Bishop, Maxine Fothergill and Chris Taylor (all Conservative). The population of the ward at the 2011 Census was 11,128.

Northend Road, part of the A206 road passes the east side of Colyers travelling, north to south it forms some of the ward's eastern boundary. The A220 road passes north to south on the western side of Colyers and forms some of the western boundary; it is named Bexley Road to the north and Erith Road to the south. The ward's southern boundary follows some of railway line east of Barnehurst railway station the on the Bexleyheath Line.

References

External links
Colyers Ward Web Page - http://colyers-conservatives.jimdo.com/
Cllr Chris Taylor's web page https://web.archive.org/web/20110718143506/http://christaylor.yourcllr.com/

Wards of the London Borough of Bexley